Jeremy Gibbs (born July 3, 1985) is a former Canadian football defensive tackle. He was signed as an undrafted free agent by the BC Lions in 2008. He played college football at Oregon. On August 30, 2010, he signed as a free agent with the Hamilton Tiger-Cats of the Canadian Football League.

External links
Just Sports Stats
Hamilton Tiger-Cats bio

1985 births
Living people
American players of Canadian football
BC Lions players
Canadian football defensive linemen
Oregon Ducks football players
People from Stillwater, Oklahoma
Players of American football from Oklahoma